Lokman Khan Sherwani (14 August 1910 – 27 August 1969) was an activist of the Indian independence movement under the British rule.   He was a Bengali poet and journalist. Lokman Khan Sherwani was married to Shobnom Khanam Sherwani, who was also an activist of the anti-British movement.

Political life 

He served as the provincial vice-president of the All India Forward Block under its founder Subhas Chandra Bose who continued to call for the full and immediate independence of India from British rule.  Sherwani served in many political activities, including (but not limited to):

 Provincial Vice-president of Forward Block
 President, All Bengal Tenant Farmers Committee
 President, All Bengal Tenant Farmers Committee
 President, Bengal Chemicals and Pharmaceuticals Workers Union
 President, Assam Bengal Railmen Union
 Presidential Member of the Bengal Farmers Committee
 Member of All India Farmers' Executive Committee

Books and Magazines

He authored several books including Shaobnom which was dedicated with poetry for Nobel Laureate Rabindra Nath Tagore's birth day 25th Boishak, Rokkhok Vhokok Hole Rokkha Kore Ke, Lokman Bani, Bidrohi Arab, Rupaiton, and Damama.

He served as editor of several Bengali newspapers and weekly magazines.

References

Bengali politicians
1910 births
1969 deaths
People from Chittagong
All India Forward Bloc politicians
Bengali male poets